Bissell is a manufacturer of vacuum cleaners and other floor care products.

Bissell may also refer to:

 Bissell, New Jersey, United States, unincorporated community
 Bissell (surname), people with the surname Bissell
 Bissel bogie or Bissel axle (sometimes spelt Bissell), a type of locomotive wheelset
 Bissell (cycling team), American professional road cycling team
 Bissell Tower, a historic standpipe water tower in College Hill, St. Louis

See also
 Bissel (disambiguation)
 Bissell Bridge (disambiguation)